Knight-Hennessy Scholars is an international graduate-level scholarship program for study at Stanford University. Established in 2016, the program prepares students to take leadership roles in finding creative solutions to complex global issues. Scholars receive full funding to pursue any graduate degree at Stanford and have additional opportunities for leadership training, mentorship, and experiential learning across multiple disciplines.

Program
The Knight-Hennessy Scholars program is inspired by programs such as the Rhodes Scholarship, with a focus on attracting students with a wide range of backgrounds from around the world. In addition to their graduate studies, scholars participate in leadership development programs and immersive study trips, and have opportunities for mentorship with thought leaders in business, government and nonprofit fields.

Selection
Since 2018, the program annually offers financial support comprising full tuition and fees, room and board, related academic expenses, and a stipend for living expenses. Successful applicants to the Knight-Hennessy scholars program demonstrate leadership, independence of thought, and civic commitment.

Potential applicants apply to the Knight-Hennessy scholars program and also apply separately to a graduate degree program at one of Stanford's seven schools. The inaugural class of 51 scholars from 21 countries, pursuing degrees in 31 academic departments at all seven of Stanford's schools, was announced on February 15, 2018. Chosen from 3,601 applicants, the inaugural cohort was 57% female, majority nonwhite, and 23% first-generation US citizens. They earned undergraduate degrees at 38 different schools, and 63% hold non-US passports, from countries including Afghanistan, Argentina, Australia, Canada, China, Colombia, Egypt, Germany, India, Israel, Italy, Mexico, Myanmar, New Zealand, Nigeria, Romania, South Korea, Syria, Tajikistan, and the United Kingdom. The inaugural cohort arrived at Stanford in the fall of 2018, with up to 100 scholarships awarded annually in subsequent years. In 2019, a class of 75 scholars is anticipated. Students will receive funding for up to three years toward a master's degree. Scholars pursuing doctorates or medical degrees can receive additional funding beyond the three years from their departments.

Campus

Scholars are housed among Stanford's graduate students, approximately 80% of whom live on campus. Stanford has constructed Denning House on the shore of Lake Lagunita; the on-campus building serves as the center for the Knight-Hennessy scholars community. Scholars gather at Denning House for presentations, workshops and social events. New York architectural firm Ennead designed the two-story building, which has classrooms, a dining area, and meeting and lecture rooms, as well as office space for a fellow-in-residence and for the program's administrative staff. The building is a gift from Steven A. Denning, chair of the school's Board of Trustees, and his wife, Roberta Bowman Denning, chair of the Arts Advisory Board and the Humanities & Science Council.

See also
Clarendon Scholarship
Gates Cambridge Scholarship
Churchill Scholarship
 Harry S. Truman Scholarship
 Marshall Scholarship
 Rhodes Scholarship
 Schwarzman Scholars
 Jardine Scholarship
 Yenching Scholarship
German Academic Scholarship Foundation
 Schulich Leader Scholarships
The Flinn Scholarship

References

External links
 

Stanford University
Scholarships in the United States
2016 establishments in California
Awards established in 2016